Castilho is a municipality in São Paulo, Brazil

Castilho may also refer to:

 Castilho (surname), a list of notable people with the surname
 Del Castilho, a neighborhood in Rio de Janeiro, Brazil
 Nova Castilho,a  municipality in São Paulo, Brazil
 NRP Augusto de Castilho, a Portuguese warship of WWI

See also
 Castillo (disambiguation)